This is a list of National Historic Landmarks in U.S. commonwealths and territories, associated states, and foreign states.

Included are lists of National Historic Landmarks (NHLs) and of National Park Service administered areas in U.S. Commonwealths and territories, U.S.-associated states, and in the foreign state of Morocco.  There are 23 NHLs in these areas.

NHLs in U.S. commonwealths and territories

|}

NHLs in associated states
This is a complete list of the five National Historic Landmarks in sovereign states that are in free association with the United States.

|}

U.S. NHLs in foreign states

|}

National Park Service Areas in U.S. Commonwealths and Territories
Also of historical interest are:
 Christiansted National Historic Site, in U.S. Virgin Islands
 Salt River Bay National Historical Park and Ecological Preserve, in U.S. Virgin Islands (also an NHL, listed above as Columbus Landing Site)
 San Juan National Historic Site, in Puerto Rico
 War in the Pacific National Historical Park in Guam

Other National Park Service-administered areas in U.S. commonwealths and territories are:
National Park of American Samoa, in American Samoa
Buck Island Reef National Monument, in U.S. Virgin Islands
Virgin Islands Coral Reef National Monument, in U.S. Virgin Islands
Virgin Islands National Park, in U.S. Virgin Islands
American Memorial Park (affiliated area), in the Northern Mariana Islands

A former US National Historical Site is St. Thomas National Historic Site, transferred to Virgin Islands.

See also
 List of National Historic Landmarks by state
 National Register of Historic Places listings in American Samoa
 National Register of Historic Places listings in Palau
 National Register of Historic Places listings in Puerto Rico
 National Register of Historic Places listings in the Federated States of Micronesia
 National Register of Historic Places listings in the Marshall Islands
 National Register of Historic Places listings in the Northern Mariana Islands
 National Register of Historic Places listings in the United States Virgin Islands

References

External links

List of National Historic Landmarks by State
 National Historic Landmarks Program, at National Park Service

02
U.S. commonwealths and territories
National Historic Landmarks